Making News: Texas Style was a 2007 TV Guide Network reality series based in the Midland/Odessa, Texas Metro area, following the work lives of the anchors and reporters at KOSA-TV, the local CBS affiliate in the nation's 159th-ranked media market. The show aired on Monday nights at 8/7C on the TV Guide Network.

Production
The program was taped at KOSA's studio at Music City Mall, which is owned by KOSA's parent company and is located in Odessa, contrary to the title sequence.

The series featured stories from Odessa and Midland as well as Goldsmith and Pecos. Sometimes, news anchors at rival station KWES-TV, the market's local NBC affiliate, were followed, but not as frequently.

Reception
The series marked the shifting priorities of the TV Guide Network as it "veered harder into entertainment" and "extended the channel's thematic interest in television."  The series was described as a ratings success for the network, doubling its average primetime household rating and leading to a 2008 spinoff series set in Savannah, Georgia.

Writing for Texas Monthly, TV critic Christopher Kelly compared the program to mockumentaries like Waiting for Guffman, calling it " a witty, insightful, and even touching look at a television station that’s probably not much bigger than your average high school AV club" and said the show "blows to smithereens every last stereotype of small-minded, small-town Texas."   New York Daily News critic Richard Huff said that the series was "fun to watch", but he thought that it largely confirmed the stereotypes of local television news as "cheesy, overwrought and sensational".

Cast
*The cast is listed by appearance in theme sequence*
Jay Hendricks- Anchor
Kara Lee- Reporter
Jose Gaona - News Director
Tatum Hubbard- Anchor (listed as Co-Anchor in first two episodes)
Gary Williams Jr.- Producer
Melissa Correa- Reporter
Bill Warren- Anchor (Dropped as Anchor in second episode, Listed as Reporter in third)*Not Listed in title sequence and appeared on show*
Craig Stewart- Weather Director
Greg Morgan- meteorologist
Jeff Stewart- Sports Director
Mike Barker- Anchor
Javi Perez - Sports Reporter
Catherine Collins - Reporter
Armando Saldivar - Reporter
Krista Escamilla - Morning Anchor
Eddie Garcia - Reporter
Allyson Powell - Reporter
The entire KOSA news team can be found here: KOSA-TV Staff

See also
 Making News: Savannah Style (2008 spinoff)

References

External links
Making News: Texas Style Official Site
CBS 7 Official Site

2000s American reality television series
2007 American television series debuts
2007 American television series endings
Television series about journalism
Television series about television
Television shows filmed in Texas
Television shows set in Texas
Pop (American TV channel) original programming